Liaoning University of Traditional Chinese Medicine or LNUTCM is a university in Liaoning Province, China, with its main campus in Huanggu District, Shenyang and a branch campus in Dalian and an additional campus in Benxi. It was founded in 1958.

References

1958 establishments in China
Educational institutions established in 1958
Universities and colleges in Shenyang
Universities and colleges in Dalian
Traditional Chinese medicine